Eyalets (Ottoman Turkish: ایالت, English: State), also known as beylerbeyliks or pashaliks, were a primary administrative division of the Ottoman Empire.

From 1453 to the beginning of the nineteenth century the Ottoman local government was loosely structured. The empire was at first divided into states called eyalets, presided over by a beylerbey (title equivalent to duke in Turkish) of three tails (feathers borne on a state officer's ceremonial staff). The grand vizier was responsible for nominating all the high officers of State, both in the capital and the states. Between 1861 and 1866, these eyalets were abolished, and the territory was divided for administrative purposes into vilayets (provinces).

The eyalets were subdivided into districts called livas or sanjaks, each of which was under the charge of a pasha of one tail, with the title of mira-lira, or sanjak-bey. These provinces were usually called pashaliks by Europeans. The pasha was invested with powers of absolute government within his province, being the chief of both the military and financial departments, as well as police and criminal justice.

At official functions, the order of precedence was Egypt, Baghdad, Abyssinia, Buda, Anatolia, "Mera'ish", and the Kapudan Pasha in Asia and Buda, Egypt, Abyssinia, Baghdad, and Rumelia in Europe, with the remainder arranged according to the chronological order of their conquest.

Names

The term eyalet is sometimes translated province or governorate. Depending on the rank of the governor, they were also sometimes known as pashaliks (governed by a pasha), beylerbeyliks (governed by a bey or beylerbey), and kapudanliks (governed by a kapudan).

Pashaluk or Pashalik is the abstract word derived from pasha, denoting the quality, office or jurisdiction of a pasha or the territory administered by him. In European sources, the word "pashalic" generally referred to the eyalets.

The term 'eyalet' began to be applied to the largest administrative unit of the Ottoman Empire instead of beglerbegilik from the 1590s onward, and it continued to be used until 1867.

History

Murad I instituted the great division of the sultanate into two beylerbeyiliks of Rumelia and Anatolia, in circa 1365. With the eastward expansion of Bayezid's realms in the 1390s, a third eyalet, Rûm Eyalet, came into existence, with Amasya its chief town. This became the seat of government of Bayezid's youngest son, Mehmed I, and was to remain a residence of princely governors until the 16th century.

In 1395, Bayezid I executed the last Shishmanid Tsar of Bulgaria, and annexed his realm to Rumelia Eyalet. In 1461, Mehmed II expelled the last of the Isfendyarid dynasty from Sinop, awarding him lands thus taxation authority near Bursa in exchange for his hereditary territory. The Isfendyarid principality became a district of Anatolia Eyalet. In 1468, Karaman Eyalet was established, following the annexation of the formerly independent principality of Karaman; Mehmed II appointed his son Mustafa as governor of the new eyalet, with his seat at Konya.

The 16th century saw the greatest increase in the number of eyalets, largely through the conquests of Selim I and Süleyman I, which created the need to incorporate the new territory into the structure of the Empire, and partly through the reorganisation of existing territory. A list dated 1527 shows eight eyalets, with Egypt, Damascus, Diyarbekir and Kurdistan added to the original four. The last eyalet, however, did not survive as an administrative entity. Süleyman's conquests in eastern Turkey, Iraq and Hungary also resulted in the creation of new eyalets.

The former principality of Dulkadir became the Dulkadir Eyalet at some time after its annexation in 1522. After the Iranian campaign of 1533–6, the new eyalets of Erzurum, Van, Sharazor and Baghdad guarded the frontier with Iran. In 1541 came the creation of Budin Eyalet from part of the old Kingdom of Hungary. The Eyalet of the Archipelago was created by Süleyman I especially for Hayreddin Barbarossa in 1533, by detaching districts from the shores and islands of the Aegean which had previously been part of the eyalets of Rumelia and Anatolia, and uniting them as an independent eyalet.

In 1580, Bosnia, previously a district of Rumelia, became an eyalet in its own right, presumably in view of its strategically important position on the border with the Habsburgs. Similar considerations led to the creation of the Kanije Eyalet from the districts adjoining this border fortress, which had fallen to the Ottomans in 1600. In the same period, the annexation of the Rumelian districts on the lower Danube and the Black Sea coast, and their addition to territories between the Danube and the Dniepr along the Black Sea, created the Silistra Eyalet. At the same time, on the south-eastern shore of the Black Sea, Trebizond Eyalet came into being. The purpose of this reorganisation, and especially the creation of the eyalet of Özi was presumably to improve the defences of the Black Sea ports against the Cossacks.

By 1609, according to the list of Ayn Ali, there were 32 eyalets. Some of these, such as Tripoli, Cyprus or Tunis, were the spoils of conquest. Others, however, were the products of administrative division.

In 1795, the government launched a major reorganization of the provincial administration, with a law decreeing that there would be 28 provinces, each to be governed by a vizer. These were Adana, Aleppo, Anatolia, Baghdad, Basra, Bosnia, Childir, Crete, Damascus, Diyarbekir, Egypt, Erzurum, Habesh, Karaman, Kars, Dulkadir, the Archipelago, Morea, Mosul, Rakka, Rumelia, Sayda, Sharazor, Silistra, Sivas, Trebizond, Tripoli, Van. In practice, however, central control remained weak, and beylerbeyis continued to rule some provinces, instead of vizers.

Government
The beglerbegiliks where the timar system was not applied, such as Abyssinia, Algiers, Egypt, Baghdad, Basra and Lahsa, were more autonomous than the others. Instead of collecting provincial revenues through sipahis, the beglerbegi transferred fixed annuals sums to Istanbul, known as the salyane.

By 1500, the four central eyalets of the Empire, Rumelia, Anatolia, Rum and Karaman, were under direct rule. Wallachia, Moldavia and the Khanate of the Crimea, territories which Mehmed II had brought under his suzerainty, remained in the control of native dynasties tributary to the Sultan. So, too, did the Kingdom of Hungary after the battle of Mohács in 1526.

Map

List
From the mid-14th century until the late 16th century, only one new beylerbeylik (Karaman) was established.

Disappeared before 1609
The eyalets that existed before 1609 but disappeared include the following:

Eyalets in 1609
Conquests of Selim I and Suleyman I in the 16th century required an increase in administrative units.  By the end of the latter half of the century there were as many as 42 eyalets, as the beylerbeyliks came to be known.  The chart below shows the administrative situation as of 1609.

Sources:
Colin Imber. The Ottoman Empire, 1300-1650: The structure of Power. (Houndmills, Basingstoke, Hampshire, UK: Palgrave Macmillan, 2002.)
Halil Inalcik. The Ottoman Empire: The Classical Age 1300–1600. Trans. Norman Itzkowitz and Colin Imber. (London: Weidenfeld & Nicolson, 1973.)
Donald Edgar Pitcher. An Historical Geography of the Ottoman Empire (Leiden, Netherlands: E.J. Brill, 1972.)

Established 1609–1683

Established 1826–1864

Maps

Modern usage of the term
Turkish Language Association defines the word eyalet as "an administrative division having some kind of administrative independence" and in modern Turkish, the word eyalet is used widely in the context of federalism, corresponding to the English word state. While the word eyalet is out of use in Turkish public administration, replaced long ago by ils under a unitary structure, top-level administrative subdivisions of numerous federal states are called eyalets in Turkish, such as the states of Australia, Austria, Brazil, Germany, India, Malaysia, Mexico and the United States, along with the provinces of Argentina, Canada and Pakistan, deferent to the modern definition of the word. Albeit China and Iran are legally unitary states, these countries' provinces are also referred to as eyalets in Turkish.

See also
 Subdivisions of the Ottoman Empire

References

Further reading

Halil Inalcik. The Ottoman Empire: The Classical Age 1300-1600. Trans. Norman Itzkowitz and Colin Imber. (London: Weidenfeld & Nicolson, 1973.)
 Paul Robert Magocsi. Historical Atlas of Central Europe. (2nd ed.) Seattle, WA, USA: Univ. of Washington Press, 2002)
Nouveau Larousse illustré, undated (early 20th century), passim (in French)
Donald Edgar Pitcher. An Historical Geography of the Ottoman Empire. (Leiden, Netherlands: E.J. Brill, 1972., includes 36 color maps)
Westermann, Großer Atlas zur Weltgeschichte (in German, includes maps)

External links
  Contains a list of eyalets, or 'beglerbei'.
  Includes a list of provinces or 'beierbei'.
  With a list of 'beglerbegatus'.
  With a list of 'beglerbeg' and 'sangiacks'.
  With a list of 'beglerbeglics'.
  Includes a list of beglerbegliks and sanjaks.
  With a list of Eyalets and livas.
  The appendix includes a list of 'government-generals', sanjaks, and their governors.

Subdivisions of the Ottoman Empire
Types of administrative division
Former types of subdivisions of Bosnia and Herzegovina